Colette Sultana (born 25 June 1995 in Cambridge) is an English-born professional squash player who represents Malta internationally, for example at the Commonwealth Games. As of August 2018, she was ranked number 103 in the world.

Personal
Sultana attended Millfield School between 2011 and 2013. She graduated from Columbia University in May 2017, and represented the Lions varsity squash team during her time there, winning many accolades and awards.

References

1995 births
Living people
Sportspeople from Cambridge
Maltese female squash players
Columbia Lions women's squash players
Squash players at the 2018 Commonwealth Games
Commonwealth Games competitors for Malta
People educated at Millfield